Amghar Mohammed Ameziane, Prince of the Rif (Tamazight: ⴰⵎⵖⴰⵔ ⵎⵓⵃⴰⵏⴷ ⴰⵎⵥⵢⴰⵏ; also known as El Mizzian by the Spanish) was a leader of the Riffian resistance against the Spanish occupation of Northern Morocco and last Tribal Monarch until his death in 1912, where President Abd el-Krim. He is the great-great-grandfather of Massinissa of the Rif.

Name
His full name was Mohamed Ben Lhaj Mohamed Ben Hado Ben Ahmed Ben Abdessalam Ben Saleh, the founder of the zawiya of Azghenghan. He was known as Cherif Sidi Mohamed (Mohand) Amezian.
His family created the Zawiya Al Qadiria, which is also known by the Zawiya of Sidi Ahmed o Abdsalam in Zeghanghane and lies within the sphere of Ait Bouifrour, one of the fifth branches which constitutes the Qaliat tribe.

Early life
Most references mention that he was born in 1859, others say 1860, these two years date back to the Tetouan war which witnessed the victory of Spain over Morocco. He took the Qur'an by heart in the Zawia which was led by his father in Zeghanghane, between 1887 and 1891 he joined Al-Qaraouiyin mosque in Fes to pursue his studies. After accomplishing his education he returned to his birthplace, Zeghanghane, where he didn't confine himself in the Zawia waiting for gifts and charities, he rather practiced trade by transporting goods cows and beasts between the Rif and Algeria.

Confrontation with Bou Hmara
After 1907, following the cession by Bou Hmara of the mining operations in the area to the Spanish, Ameziane prosecuted the former. Bou hmara tried to arrest him in the early 1907, but he managed to escape and took refuge in the Moroccan army whose base was near Melilla.

Ameziane fought with its soldiers when they attempted to outflank the rebellion of Bou hmara in the eastern region. However Bou hmara and his team defeated the weakened Makhzen in 1907, then the rest of the army including Amezian took refuge in Melilla in the beginning of 1908.

During the domination of Bou hmara over the eastern Rif he authorized two companies, a Spanish and a French one, to exploit the iron and lead mines in Bouifror and build two railway lines connecting them to Melilla. But after the crushing defeat inflicted on Bou hmara by the Ait Waryaghel tribe he returned to the east and found out that the eastern Riffian tribes had chosen Cherif Mohamed Amezian as their leader in October 1908. They hindered railway projects and the exploitation of the mines.

Bou hmara, lacking enough Spanish support, was forced out of the area in late 1908.

Resistance against Spain
Spain took advantage of Bou hmara's rebellion in addition to the anarchy that prevailed in eastern region and the enmity which existed between the Riffian tribes. During February and March 1909 it managed to occupy Kariat Arekmane and Ras El Ma, then it resumed the building of the railway and the exploitation of the mines. It also benefited from the growing influence of its allies in the region, and poured money on them besides providing them with the newest artilleries, they used to support Spanish incursions openly and even tried to convince notables and tribes of the advantages of the Spanish incursions.

Amezian stood firm in opposing the Spanish invasion and refused all offers and lures given by general José Marina Vega, the military governor of Melilla. After meeting raffian tribes with whom he held meetings during which he was accompanied by Alfeqih Mohamed Hado Alazouzi and tackled the resistance issue. Then Cherif Mohamed Amezian had to wait until the end of the agricultural season when peasants gather their crops and seasonal immigrants return from Algeria so as to express his opposition militarily by attacking Sidi Mosa on 9 July 1909, thus, he put an end to the vibration of opinions and the hesitation which he began to perceive within the tribes.

Following a shutdown of the construction of the railway, building works resumed and, on 9 July, Ameziane instigated a party of Riffians (making them believe they would receive support from the neighbouring tribes) to attack a group of 13 Spanish workers, killing and slitting the throats of 4 of them and wounding 3. This prompted up a retaliatory action by Marina Vega, kickstarting the Second Melillan campaign.

Spanish losses
The limited garrison in Melilla, unable to deal with the July 1909 attacks, forced the Spanish government to call for press gang in the Mainland, with the recruits lacking in military preparation. The Spanish officers were also outdated in their tactics and did not have knowledge of the field, so the morale of the privates was very low. On 18 July, about 5,000 Riffians advanced into the position of Sidi Hamet el Hach and were repelled by the Spanish. Riffians resumed the attack in the night, retreating after suffering 300 deaths and inflicting 12 deaths and 22 wounded to the enemy. Ensuing confrontations in los Lavaderos and Sidi Musa followed on 23 July.

On 27 July the Spanish were handed an important defeat on 27 July 1909 in the battle of "Aghazar n Ouchen" or Barranco del Lobo (Wolf's Ravine) 4 km away from Melilla, where 17 Spanish officers (including Gral. Guillermo Pintos) and 136 privates were killed, to which 599 wounded added.

This defeat did not deter the Spanish army which attacked with more than 40,000 soldiers under the leadership of three generals (Alfaro, Tobar and Miralis), but they met another defeat on 20 September 1909 in Ijdyawen, the territory of ait chigar tribe, the Spanish troops could not stand in the way of the strong will and determination of Imjahden (resistance) "warriors" under the leadership of Mohamed Amezian.

Riffian resistance
The organization of the Riffian resistance in this period was marked by a great precession, each of the Riffian tribes devoted a number of its men to stand by permanently in the stronghold of the Imjahden. Each tribe was free to organize, substitute its men and provide munitions. The men in the stronghold used to light up fires at night once they perceive the omens of hostile attacks, whoever sees that sign lights up another fire so that all tribes will be aware of whats going on that night and rush into the battle to join the imjahden's front lines.

Change in Spanish military strategy
Spain learned from its defeats in the autumn and summer of 1909, and waited until the end of the ploughing season to change its military strategy in which the focus was on peaceful penetration targeting weaker tribes nearby Melilia and pouring money and trade privileges on them. Thus, Spain moved to a dangerous step when it intensified the recruitments of the locals so as to benefit from their gun experiences and their accurate knowledge of the topography of the region.

They played the role of a human shields in the front lines of the Spanish troops. This led to the disheartening of many Ruffian imjahden fighters from central Rif, especially the Ait waryaghels, who left their strongholds accusing the tribe of Aqqliat of treachery.

Moreover, the influence exerted by the agents of Spain within the tribes was detrimental to Riffian resistance, they used to play the role of spies providing Spanish intelligence with information and implementing its plans which aims to stir disagreements and clashes between Imjahden members and their families, and also between those tribesmen recruited in the Spanish army.

Who ever stands in their way was exposing himself to death penalty. Many inhabitants were compelled to be recruited in the Spanish army which provided uniform and guns which stands for power and self-protection. As a result, Spain occupied Bouarek plain and the region between Azghenghen and Elhociema, in addition to Nador and Selouan. Nevertheless, the Imjahden were able to inflict many defeats on the Spanish army (for example: Dahar Ambochanof between Selouan and Waxan).

Ameziane's retreat
Under these conditions Mohamed Ameziane retreated to Aitbouifrour and establishes a new stronghold in Souq Aljouma (Friday market) in Amaworo. Confrontations abated since late 1909 to 1911, during these two years Mohamed Ameziane kept refusing all offers and lures given by Spain which was convinced that the way to colonize the Rif leads to the attraction of Mohammed Ameziane.

And after he refused huge sums of money in parallel with the beginning of negotiation concerning the protectorate, he was suggested to be the representative of Spain in front of the Moroccan Sultan. But he opposed.

Final battles and death

Confrontations between Riffian resistance and Spanish forces renewed when the resistance raided on a group of soldiers which escorted a Spanish topographic expedition. The most important battles took place in the surroundings of Kert river in which resistance inflicted huge human loss and material damages on the Spanish army.

After September 1911 general Ardonit was killed in the battles of Imarofen and Izhafen in Ait Bouifrour. Sporadic clashes continued until 14 May 1912 when Spain targeted the occupation of Azib Allal o Qador, in this operation spies watched the movement of Amezian and 700 Imjahden fighters towards Bani Sidal tribe, they followed his steps until he stopped in Tawrirt Kdiya's mosque, then Spanish forces were informed and rushed to besiege him.

When Mohamed Amezian was aware of that he prayed Al-Fajr and gave the choice to his companions; either to fight and die as martyrs or withdraw, then he started with the remaining companions shooting the enemy after the indigenous troops within the Spanish army refused the appeal to join the Imjahden.

He was killed on 15 May 1912 in the vicinity of the position of Kaddur. Jaime Samaniego y Martínez-Fortún, a Spanish lieutenant recently incorporated to the Regulares, also died in the exchange of shots. Following the death of their leader the rest of the members of the Riffian harka present in the area surrendered upon the arrival of General Moltó.

The body was wearing a blue robe with a brown jillaba and two silk shirts, carrying a sigil with his name, a scapular, a small edition of the Quran, a handkerchief, a Mauser and a Browning weapons, and plenty of ammunition. The corpse was moved to the position of Ulad Ganen, where he was positively identified by a number of Spanish and Riffians who had met him in person in the past. The corpse was respectfully transported to the mosque of Segangan, where he was buried next to his people. Abd-el Krim beheld the body and wrote a letter to his father describing it.

References
Informational notes

Citations

External links
El Protectorado español en Marruecos: la historia trascendida

19th-century Moroccan people
20th-century Moroccan people
Berber rebels
Deaths by firearm in Morocco
Colonial history of Morocco
Moroccan military leaders
Moroccan military personnel killed in action
Moroccan independence activists
Riffian people
Kert campaign
Second Melillan campaign